Ballard School is a private, private school located in New Milton, Hampshire, for children aged 2 to 16 years. The Headmaster is Andrew McCleave (since 2018).

Ballard School offers scholarships and bursaries, and does not require an entrance exam for admission The school regularly holds Open Mornings for prospective pupils and parents.

History 
Ballard School was founded as the Royal Naval School by William Higgs Colborne and James Cruickshank at Lee-on-the-Solent in August 1895. Great Ballard House was designed by Sydney Kelway Pope M.S.A, a local Southampton architect. One of the first pupils was named Trevor John Tatham. He joined the school as a teacher in 1916 and remained until his death in 1952. Around 1905, the Royal Navy requested that the name be changed and so it was renamed as Edinburgh House School.

James Cruickshank married his partner's daughter Louisa in 1901. The school remained at premises in Manor Way, Lee-on-the-Solent throughout the first World War. In 1906, Louisa gave birth to Stuart Colborne Cruickshank, a future headmaster of Edinburgh House School. Following the deaths of both William and James, Louisa became joint Principal with her son Stuart.

Early in the 1930s, two teachers who were to play a major part in the post war development of the school joined Edinburgh House School. They were Edward (Ted) Kingsley Kefford and David William Hutchinson (Hutch)  When the 2nd World War began, the school left Lee-on-the-Solent, moving first to Wellington, Somerset and then in 1942 to Brightwell Baldwin, Oxfordshire. In 1936, Ted had married Evelyn Burt, a New Milton girl.

After the War, it was decided that the school would not move back to Lee-on-the-Solent. Ted learned that Great Ballard Estate in New Milton was on the market for sale. With the large Arts and Craft house, vegetable garden and about 40 acres of land it was ideal for use as a school. As neither he nor Stuart Cruickshank could raise the capital to purchase, Ted negotiated a lease and the school took occupation in January 1946.

Great Ballard House was built in 1904 by John Arnold Ubsdell (2nd) and his wife Genevieve Ann (née Eads). In 1924, the house and estate had been leased to a newly formed school named ‘Great Ballard School’. This school remained in occupation until 1940, when it moved to Clayesmore School in Iwerne Minster, Dorset before moving first to Stowell Park Gloucestershire, then Camberley Surrey and finally to Eartham West Sussex.

‘Ted’ Kefford was Headmaster of Edinburgh House until his retirement in July 1969. Earlier in that year discussions with the Headmasters of Gorse Cliff and Marchwood Park Schools led to them merging with Edinburgh House School in September 1969. The new Principal was the Rev. Ian Watson who remained in post until 1973. Extensive improvements to facilities were completed in 1970. Rev R. Drown was the next Headmaster (1973-1984) and in 1980/81 a £72,000 Development Plan was announced. Mr. J. Quibell-Smith (1984-1988) was next in post and put strong emphasis on the welfare of the pupils as well as their education and of the school being a happy place. Next came Mr A.R. Leighton (1988-1995) and a further development programme was carried out in the early 1990s. In September 1995 Mr Leighton oversaw the merger of Edinburgh House School with Fernhill Manor the adjoining girls school. The larger school was named Ballard School.

Academics 
Ballard School provides education for four key groups. Ballard School Pre-Prep consists of Nursery, Reception and Year 2. Lower Prep consists of KS2 year 3, 4 and 5. Upper Prep consists of KS2 year 6 and KS3 year 7 and 8. Senior consists of year 9, 10 and 11.

In 2015 and 2016, Ballard School achieved a 100% pass rate of A* to C GCSE results in English and Maths with 98% of the cohort achieving the Gold standard of at least five ‘good passes’ at A* to C grades (including English and Maths graded at 4 and above).

Inspection Reports 
Ballard School has been judged to be 'excellent & outstanding' by the Independent Schools Inspectorate. All reports are available on their website.

Facilities 
Ballard School is set in 34 acres of woodland, sports pitches and gardens. Each key group has a dedicated area of the school. Other facilities include:

 Three IT suites and Three libraries
 Four Senior Science laboratories and a Junior Science laboratory
 Technology workshop and art block
Outdoor heated swimming pool
Olympic sized Astro Hockey pitch
Basketball Courts
 Tennis and Netball Courts
 Spacious sports fields including Cricket Pitches and practice nets
 Fully Equipped Sports Hall
Performing Arts Centre 
Dance Studio
Music Centre with iMac suite
 Outdoor classroom
 Three separate play areas for Nursery, Pre-Prep and Lower Prep (Year's 3-5)
 Forest School (Nursery to Year 5)
 Outdoor table tennis and table football tables
Victorian ornamental garden

Notable alumni
 Mikey Jones - Paralympic gold medallist.
 Huw Montague Rendall - Opera singer
 Matt Alridge - GBR Rower
 Tim Nurse - England Hockey Player
 Kathy Rogers- Team GB waterpolo
 Oliver Hill - British Junior Sailing Team
 Robert Lawrence - Folk Singer

References 

Private schools in Hampshire
Educational institutions established in 1895
1895 establishments in England